The following is a list of FCC-licensed radio stations in the U.S. state of Wisconsin, which can be sorted by their call signs, frequencies, cities of license, licensees, and programming formats.

List of radio stations

Defunct 
 WAWA
 WDLB-FM
 WEBC-FM
 WFMR
 WGBP-FM
 WGLR
 WOKW
 WRNC-LP
 WRZC-LP
 WXXD-LP
 WZRK

References

External links
 Northpine: Upper Midwest Broadcasting
 Wisconsin Radio & TV Discussion Forum
 Your Midwest Media: Radio & TV Station Listings, News & Information

 
Wisconsin
Wisconsin-related lists